Innovation management is a combination of the management of innovation processes, and change management. It refers to product, business process, marketing and organizational innovation. Innovation management is the subject of ISO 56000 (formerly 50500) series standards being developed by ISO TC 279.

Innovation management includes a set of tools that allow managers plus workers or users to cooperate with a common understanding of processes and goals. Innovation management allows the organization to respond to external or internal opportunities, and use its creativity to introduce new ideas, processes or products. It is not relegated to R&D; it involves workers or users at every level in contributing creatively to an organization's product or service development and marketing.

By utilizing innovation management tools, management can trigger and deploy the creative capabilities of the work force for the continuous development of an organization. Common tools include brainstorming, prototyping, product lifecycle management, idea management, design thinking, TRIZ, Phase–gate model, project management, product line planning and portfolio management. The process can be viewed as an evolutionary integration of organization, technology and market by iterating series of activities: search, select, implement and capture.

The product lifecycle of products or services is getting shorter because of increased competition and quicker time-to-market, forcing organisations to reduce their time-to-market. Innovation managers must therefore decrease development time, without sacrificing quality or meeting the needs of the market.

Innovation management 

Innovation management (IM) is based on some of the ideas put forth by the Austrian economist Joseph Schumpeter, working during the 1930s, who identified innovation as a significant factor in economic growth. His book “Capitalism, Socialism and Democracy” first fully developed the concept of creative destruction.

Innovation management helps an organization grasp an opportunity and use it to create and introduce new ideas, processes, or products industriously. Creativity is the basis of innovation management; the end goal is a change in services or business process. Innovative ideas are the result of two consecutive steps, imitation and invention.

By utilizing innovation management tools, management can trigger and deploy the creative capabilities of the work force for the continuous development of an organization. Common tools include brainstorming, prototyping, product lifecycle management, ideation, TRIZ, Phase–gate model, project management, product line planning and portfolio management. The process can be viewed as an evolutionary integration of organization, technology, and market, by iterating series of activities: search, select, implement and capture.

Innovation processes can either be pushed or pulled through development. A pushed process is based on existing or newly invented technology that the organization has access to. The goal is to find profitable applications for the already-existing technology. A pulled process, by contrast, is based on finding areas where customers' needs are not met and finding solutions to those needs. To succeed with either method, an understanding of both the market and the problems are needed. By creating multi-functional development teams, containing both workers or users plus marketers, both dimensions can be solved.

Innovation, although not sufficient alone, is a necessary prerequisite for the continued survival and development of enterprises. The most direct way of business innovation is through technological innovation, disruptive innovation or social innovation.  Management of innovation, however, plays a significant role in promoting technological and institutional innovation.

The goal of innovation management within an organization is to cultivate a suitable environment to encourage innovation. The suitable environment would help the organizations get more cooperation projects, even ‘the take-off platform for business ventures’. Senior management's support is crucial to successful innovation; clear direction, endorsement, and support are essential to innovation pursuits.

Managing complex innovation 

Innovation is often a technological change that outperforms a previous practice. To lead or sustain with innovations, managers need to concentrate heavily on the innovation network, which requires deep understanding of the complexity of innovation. Collaboration is an important source of innovation. Innovations are increasingly brought to the market by networks of organizations, selected according to their comparative advantages, and operating in a coordinated manner.

When a technology goes through a major transformation phase and yields a successful innovation, it becomes a great learning experience, not only for the parent industry but other industries as well. Big innovations are generally the outcome of intra- and interdisciplinary networking among technological sectors, along with combination of implicit and explicit knowledge. Networking is required, but network integration is the key to success for complex innovation. Social economic zones, technology corridors, free trade agreements, and technology clusters are some of the ways to encourage organizational networking and cross-functional innovations.

Innovation management tools 
Antonio Hidalgo and Jose Albor proposed the use of typologies as an innovation management tool. The study conducted at a European level used 10 typologies for knowledge-driven Innovation Management Tools. These typologies were found by looking at 32 characteristics that classify Innovation Management Tools. Hidalgo and Albors were able to narrow the list down to 8 criteria (knowledge-driven focus, strategic impact, degree of availability, level of documentation, practical usefulness, age of the IMT, required resources for implementation, measurability), that are especially relevant for IMTs in the knowledge-driven economy (knowledge economy). The advantage of using typologies is the easy integration of new methods and the availability of a broader scope of tools.

Innovation management typologies 

''Criteria for selection of tools: IMTs that were sufficiently developed and standardized, that aimed to improve the competitiveness of firms by focusing on knowledge and that were freely accessible on the market and not subject to any copyright or licensing agreement.

Economic theory
In economic theory, the management of innovation has been studied by Philippe Aghion and Jean Tirole (1994). Their work is based on the Grossman-Hart-Moore property rights approach to the theory of the firm. According to this theory, the optimal allocation of property rights helps to alleviate the hold-up problem (an underinvestment problem that occurs when investments are non-contractible). In the work of Oliver Hart and his co-authors, the parties agree on the ownership structure that maximizes the parties’ expected total surplus (which they can divide with suitable up-front transfer payments according to their ex ante bargaining power). In contrast, Aghion and Tirole argue that in the relationship between a research unit and a customer the parties might not agree on the optimal ownership structure, since research units are often cash-constrained and thus cannot make up-front payments to customers. The model is also known as “the R&D game” (Tirole, 1999). Laboratory research using the methods of experimental economics has found support for the theory.

See also
 Collaborative innovation networka social construct used to describe innovative teams
 Design strategy
 Diffusion of innovationsa theory that seeks to explain how, why, and at what rate new ideas and technology spread through cultures
 Frugal innovationprocess of reducing the complexity and cost of a good and its production
 Ideas bankshared resource, usually a website, where people post, exchange, discuss, and polish new ideas
 Open innovationa paradigm that assumes that organizations can and should use external ideas as well as internal ideas
 Pro-innovation biasthe belief that an innovation should be adopted by whole society without the need of its alteration
 Technology forecastingthe prediction of future characteristics of useful technological machines, procedures or techniques
 Technology scoutinga method of technology forecasting

References

Further reading 
 Edward Huizenga (University of Amsterdam, The Netherlands & Benthurst & Co, The Netherlands) (2014). The Knowledge Enterprise Innovation Lessons from Industry Leaders (2nd Edition) Available at: http://www.worldscientific.com/worldscibooks/10.1142/p964
 Edison, H.,  Ali, N.B., & Torkar, R. (2013). Towards innovation measurement in the software industry. Journal of Systems and Software 86(5), 1390-1407. Available at: http://www.torkar.se/resources/jss-edisonNT13.pdf 
 Abrahamson, E. (1996). Management fashion: Academy of Management Review, 21: 254–285.
 Amabile, T. (1996). Creativity in context. New York: Westview Press
 Burgelman, R. A. (1991). Intraorganizational ecology of strategy making and organizational adaptation: Theory and field research. Organization Science, 2: 239–262.
 Brown K. and Stephen P. Osborne (2005) MANAGING CHANGE AND INNOVATION IN PUBLIC SERVICE ORGANIZATIONS. New York: Routledge. P6.
 Brown, Terrence and Ulijn, Johannes. 2004. Innovation, entrepreneurship and culture: the interaction between technology, progress and economic growth. Cheltenham: Edward Elgar.
 Cappellin R. and Wink R. (2009) International Knowledge and Innovation Networks Knowledge Creation and Innovation in Medium-technology Clusters. UK: Edward Elgar Publishing Limited.
 Chen J. and Qingrui Xu. (2012) Leverage Innovation Capability Application of Total Innovation Management in China's SME's Study. Singapore: ZHEJIANG UNIVERSITY PRESS. P35.
 Damanpour, F. (1996), “Organizational complexity and innovation: developing and testing multiple contingency models”, Management Science, Vol. 42 No. 5, pp. 693–716.
 Damanpour, F., & Aravind, D. (2012). Managerial innovation: Conceptions, processes, and antecedents. Management and Organization Review, 8(2), 423-454.
 Damanpour, F. (2014). Footnotes to research on management innovation. Organization Studies, 35(9), 1265-1285.
 Eveleens, C. (2010). Innovation management; a literature review of innovation process models and their implications. Working Paper HAN University of Applied Sciences.
 Freeman, C. (1995), The national system of innovation in historical perspective. Cambridge Journal of Economics, 19(1) : 5 -24．
 Fonseca, Jose. 2003. Complexity and innovation in organizations. New York: Routledge.
 Fuglsang, Lars. 2008. Innovation and the creative process: towards innovation with care. Cheltenham: Edward Elgar.
 Griffin, Ricky. 2011. Fundamentals of management. New York: Cengage Learning.
 Jason, F. 2013. Our 'Kodak moments' – and creativity – are gone. The Guardian. 23 August 2013. Accessed 26 April 2014.
 Kelly, P. and Kranzburg M. (1978). Technological Innovation: A Critical Review of Current Knowledge. San Francisco: San Francisco Press.
 Levine, Arthur. 1980. Why innovation fails. Albany: State University of New York Press. 
 Maier, D., Sven-Joachim, I., Fortmuller, A., Maier, A. (2017) - Development and operationalization of a model of innovation management system as part of an integrated quality-environment-safety system, Amfiteatru Economic, Volume: 19  Issue: 44  Pages: 302-314 
 Maier D, Verjel, A, Bercovici A, Maier A, (2017) - Innovation Management System - a Necessity for Business Performance, Proceedings of 29th International-Business-Information-Management-Association Conference, Vienna, Austria,  May 3–04, 2017 
 Malerba F. (2008). Innovation Networks in Industries. UK: Edward Elgar Publishing Limited.
 Mr. Donal O’Connell (2011). Harvesting External Innovation: Managing External Relationships and Intellectual Property. England/USA: Gower Publishing Limited/Gower Publishing Company .
 Oslo Manual (2005) -  – © OECD/EUROPEAN COMMUNITIES 2005
 Paul, B. 2007. Entrepreneurship and Innovation Opportunity, Innovation and Entrepreneurship. In: Paul, B. (eds). Entrepreneurship and Small Business, New York: Palgrave Macmillan. p. 55-76.
 Rothwell, R., (1994) Towards the Fifth-generation Innovation Process, International Marketing Review, Vol. 11 No. 1, 1994, pp. 7–31
 Siltala, R., Taatila, V. & Alajääski, J. (2014). Finnish teachers' views on innovative teaching. In Virkajärvi, M. (eds.) 2014. Työn tulevaisuus. University of Tampere. Tampere, Finland, 280-297.
 Silverstein D. (2008) Insourcing Innovation How to Achieve Competitive Excellence Using TRIZ. US: Auerbach Publications.
 Schumpeter, J. A. (1934), The Theory of Economic Development: An Inquiry into Profits, Capital, Credit, Interest and the Business Cycle, Harvard University Press, Cambridge, MA.
 Shavinina, Larisa. 2003. The international handbook on innovation. Oxford: Pergamon.
 Thompson, V.A. (1965), “Bureaucracy and innovation”, Administrative Science Quarterly, Vol. 10, pp. 1–20.
 Verloop J. (2004). Insight in Innovation: Managing Innovation by Understanding the Laws of Innovation. Netherlands: Elsevier B.V.
 Wagner, Stephen. 2008. Managing innovation: the new competitive edge for logistics service-providers. Vienna: Haupt.
 Wherrett, R. (2018). 101 Executive Uses for a Square Camel: and other lightbulb moments in problem solving - . Glasgow: Reroq Publishing
 Zbaracki, M. J. (1998). The rhetoric and reality of total quality management. Administrative Science Quarterly, 43: 602–638.
 van Zyl, Jay. (2011). Built to Thrive: using innovation to make your mark in a connected world. San Francisco.

Innovation
Management by type
Strategic management
Business planning
Corporate development